Taihu, also known as Lake Tai or Lake Taihu, is a lake in the Yangtze Delta and one of the largest freshwater lakes in China. The lake is in Jiangsu province and a significant part of its southern shore forms its border with Zhejiang. The lake contains about 90 islands, ranging in size from a few square meters to several square kilometers.

Lake Tai is linked to the Grand Canal and is the origin of a number of rivers, including Suzhou Creek. In recent years, Lake Tai has been plagued by pollution as the surrounding region experienced rapid industrial development.

Formation
Scientific studies suggest that Lake Tai's circular structure is the result of a meteor impact, which resulted in shatter cones, shock-metamorphosed quartz, microtektites, and shock-metamorphic unloading fractures. The prospective impact crater has been dated to be greater than 70 million years old and possibly from the late Devonian Period. However, new research suggests that present evidence shows no impact crater structure or shock-mineral at Lake Tai. Fossils indicate that Lake Tai was dry land until the ingression of the East China Sea during the Holocene epoch.  The growing deltas of the Yangtze and Qiantang rivers eventually sealed off Lake Tai from the sea, and the influx of fresh water from rivers and rains turned it into a freshwater lake.

Scenic locations

There are limestone formations at the foot of the adjacent Dongting Mountain. These "scholar's rocks" or "Taihu stones" are often prized as a decorating material for traditional Chinese gardens, as exemplified by those preserved as museums in nearby Suzhou.

Three of the lake's islands are preserved as a national geological park under the name Sanshan. They are famed as a former haunt of local bandits. Mei Yuan is also located in Lake Tai, along with Yuantouzhu. Yuantouzhu received its name ("Turtle Head Isle") from the shape of its outline.

Ferris wheel

The "Star of Lake Tai" is a giant,  Ferris wheel on the shore of the lake.  Completed in 2008, it takes 18 minutes to complete one revolution. Passengers can enjoy the scenery of Lake Tai and the city center.  At night, lighting effects are switched on around the wheel.

Landmarks
 Sheraton Huzhou Hot Spring Resort is situated on the southern shore of the lake.

Business and industry
The lake is known for its productive fishing industry and is often covered by fleets of small private fishing boats.  Since the late 1970s, harvesting food products such as fish and crabs has been invaluable to people living along the lake and has contributed significantly to the economy of the surrounding area.

The lake is home to an extensive ceramic industry, including the Yixing pottery factory, which produces Yixing clay teapots.

Pollution

Pollution of the lake has been ongoing for decades despite efforts to reduce pollution that were not sustained and thus proved ineffective.  In the 1980s and 1990s, the number of industries in the lake region tripled, and the population also increased significantly.  One billion tons of wastewater, 450,000 tons of garbage, and 880,000 tons of animal waste were dumped into the shallow lake in 1993 alone.  The central government intervened and initiated a campaign to clean up the lake, setting a deadline to comply with pollution standards.  When the deadline was not met, 128 factories were closed on New Year's Eve in 1999.  Compliance improved somewhat afterwards, but the pollution problem remained severe.

In May 2007, the lake was overtaken by a major algae bloom and by major pollution with cyanobacteria.  The Chinese government called the lake a major natural disaster despite the anthropogenic origin of this environmental catastrophe.  With the average price of bottled water rising to six times the normal rate, the government banned all regional water providers from implementing price hikes.  (The lake provides water to 30 million residents, including about one million in Wuxi.)  By October 2007, it was reported that the Chinese government had shut down or given notice to over 1,300 factories around the lake.  Nonetheless, Wu Lihong, one of the leading environmentalists who had been publicizing pollution of the lake, was sentenced to three years in prison for alleged extortion of one of the polluters, but, undeterred, alleged in 2010 that not a single factory was closed.

Jiangsu province planned to clean the lake; chaired by Wen Jiabao, the State Council set a target to complete the task by 2012.  However, in 2010 The Economist reported that pollution had broken out again and that Wu Lihong, released from prison that April, was claiming that the government was trying to suppress news of the outbreak while switching to other supplies in place of lake water.

See also
List of possible impact structures on Earth

References

Notes

Citations

Tai
Taihu
Tai
Tai
Tourist attractions in Zhejiang
Tourist attractions in Jiangsu
Bodies of water of Jiangsu